Jorunna alisonae is a species of sea slug, a dorid nudibranch, a shell-less marine gastropod mollusc in the family Discodorididae.

Distribution
This species was described from Hawaii. Previously identified with the European Jorunna tomentosa.

Biology
Jorunna alisonae is a common species usually found in the intertidal zone or shallow depths at protected to moderately exposed rocky sites. It feeds on the violet-brown sponge Haliclona permollis.

References

Discodorididae
Gastropods described in 1976